The name Blas has been used for eight tropical cyclones in the Eastern Pacific Ocean and for one Medicane in the Mediterranean sea.

In the Eastern Pacific:
 Tropical Storm Blas (1980), stayed well away from land and caused no known impact.
 Tropical Storm Blas (1986), did not affect land.
 Tropical Storm Blas (1992), never affected land.
 Hurricane Blas (1998), Category 4 hurricane that paralleled the Mexican coast before moving out to sea.
 Tropical Storm Blas (2004), never affected land.
 Tropical Storm Blas (2010), did not make landfall.
 Hurricane Blas (2016), Category 4 hurricane that never threatened land.
 Hurricane Blas (2022), Category 1 hurricane that paralleled the Mexican coast causing dangerous surf conditions.

In the Mediterranean:
 Storm Blas (2021), affected the Balearic Archipelago, Sardinia and Corsica.

Pacific hurricane set index articles